Ketovsky District is an administrative and municipal district (raion), one of the twenty-four in Kurgan Oblast, Russia. It is located in the center of the oblast. Its administrative center is the rural locality (a selo) of Ketovo. Population:  56,488 (2002 Census);  The population of Ketovo accounts for 13.1% of the district's total population.

References

Notes

Sources

Districts of Kurgan Oblast